Coming of Age is a 1938 British comedy film directed by H. Manning Haynes and starring Eliot Makeham and Joyce Bland. The supporting cast features Evelyn Ankers. In this farce, a husband and wife grow restless and find themselves having affairs.

Cast
Eliot Makeham as Henry Strudwick
Joyce Bland as Isobel Strudwick
Jack Melford as Roger Squire
Ruby Miller as Julia Knight
Jimmy Hanley as Arthur Strudwick
Evelyn Ankers as Christine Squire
Annie Esmond as Mrs. Crowther
Aubrey Mallalieu as Mr. Myers

Critical reception
TV Guide gave the film two out of five stars, calling it an "Okay comedy...Some good character actors save this one from obscurity."

References

External links
 Coming of Age in the Internet Movie Database

1938 films
1938 comedy films
British comedy films
British black-and-white films
Films directed by H. Manning Haynes
1930s British films